Men's 10 metre air pistol was one of the fifteen shooting events at the 1996 Summer Olympics. The defending champion, Wang Yifu, set an Olympic record of 587 points in the qualification round, taking a two-point lead. His lead increased during the final up to the last shot, where he scored a mere 6.5, and then fainted. He still won his fourth Olympic medal but lost the gold to Roberto Di Donna by the closest possible margin, 0.1 point. Medical staff of the Atlanta Games connected the incident to the heat, around  outside (although the final hall was air-conditioned).

Qualification round

OR Olympic record – Q Qualified for final

Final

References

Sources

Shooting at the 1996 Summer Olympics
Men's events at the 1996 Summer Olympics